Olena Volodymyrivna Antypina (also known as Olena Schmelzer) (born 19 March 1979) is a retired tennis player from Ukraine.

Her highest singles ranking is world No. 180, which she reached in November 2005. She played on the ITF Circuit from 2000 through to 2006.

In her professional career, Antypina won 14 titles, of which one was in singles and 13 in doubles. She tried qualifying for Grand Slam tournaments on multiple occasions, but was unsuccessful with each one. She qualified for one WTA Tour event in 2005, where she lost in round one of the Tier IV tournament in Tashkent to compatriot Kateryna Bondarenko.

Her biggest ITF title came when she won the doubles of the $75k tournament at Washington D.C. in 2005, partnering Tatiana Poutchek of Belarus.

ITF Circuit finals

Singles: 5 (1–4)

Doubles: 23 (13–10)

References

External links
 
 

Living people
1979 births
Sportspeople from Zaporizhzhia
Ukrainian female tennis players